This is a list of notable events in the history of LGBT rights that took place in the year 1972.

Events
San Francisco prohibits employment discrimination based on sexual orientation in the public sector.  The city also prohibits companies that have contracts with the city from discriminating based on sexual orientation.

January
 1 — U.S. state of Hawaii repeals its sodomy law.

March
 7 — East Lansing, Michigan, becomes the first United States city to ban discrimination against homosexuals in housing, public accommodation, and employment.

April
 1 — U.S. state of Delaware decriminalizes consensual homosexual acts between adults.

June
 27 — Gay News, the first gay magazine in the United Kingdom, publishes its first issue.

July
 12 — Delegates Jim Foster and Madeline Davis become the first openly LGBT people to address a major U.S. political party's convention at the 1972 Democratic National Convention.
 24 — Peter Maloney announces his candidacy for the Toronto Board of Education in the Toronto municipal election, 1972, becoming Canada's first known openly gay political candidate.

October
 10 — The United States Supreme Court issues its ruling in Baker v. Nelson, in which the plaintiffs sought to have Minnesota's restriction of marriage to different-sex couples declared unconstitutional. The Court dismisses the case "for want of a substantial federal question".

Deaths
 August 2 — Paul Goodman, U.S. poet, writer, and public intellectual. The freedom with which Goodman revealed, in print and in public, his homosexual life and loves proved to be one of the many important cultural springboards for the emerging gay liberation movement of the early 1970s.
 December 31 — Henry Gerber, German-born American LGBT rights activist. Founded the Society for Human Rights, the first LGBT organization in the United States.

See also

Timeline of LGBT history — timeline of events from 12,000 BCE to present
LGBT rights by country or territory — current legal status around the world
LGBT social movements

Notes

References
 Bianco, David (1999). Gay Essentials: Facts For Your Queer Brain. Los Angeles, Alyson Publications. .
 Faderman, Lillian (2007). Great Events From History: Gay, Lesbian, Bisexual, and Transgender Events, 1848-2006. Salem Press. .

LGBT rights by year
1972 in LGBT history